Craspedoxantha veroniae is a species of tephritid or fruit flies in the genus Craspedoxantha of the family Tephritidae.

Distribution
Kenya.

References

Tephritinae
Insects described in 1985
Diptera of Africa